North Macedonia competed at the 2020 Winter Youth Olympics in Lausanne, Switzerland from 9 to 22 January 2020. This was the nation's first participation in an Olympic event under the country's new name.

Alpine skiing

Boys

Biathlon

Boys

Girls

Mixed

Cross-country skiing 

Boys

Girls

See also
North Macedonia at the 2020 Summer Olympics

References

Nations at the 2020 Winter Youth Olympics
North Macedonia at the Youth Olympics